Upton Hall may refer to:

 Upton Hall, Merseyside, previously manor house of Upton, Chesire, UK now home to the Upton Hall School FCJ
 Upton Hall School FCJ, in Upton, Wirral, England
 Upton Hall, Northamptonshire, England; home of Quinton House School
 Upton Hall, Nottinghamshire, England; the headquarters of the British Horological Institute
 Upton Hall, an academic building at Carlisle Barracks, Carlisle, Pennsylvania, US

Architectural disambiguation pages